Sudip Roy Barman is an Indian politician from Tripura. He served as the MLA of the Tripura Legislative Assembly from the Agartala constituency which he held since 1998 by winning four elections consecutively on INC ticket by handsome margins. In 2018, he contested from Agartala constituency and won on BJP ticket. On 7 February 2022, he quit BJP and resigned from his MLA post. On 8 February he joined the Indian National Congress in Delhi. Again on 23 June 2022, he contested from Agartala constituency and won on INC ticket defeating his nearest rival of BJP by more than 3500 votes.

Early life and education
Sudip Roy Barman was born in Agartala to Samir Ranjan Barman & Maya Roy Barman. His father Samir Barman served as the Chief Minister of Tripura from 1992 to 1993. Barman holds a degree in Mechanical Engineering from Calcutta University and a Law degree from the Tripura Government Law College. During his college days, Barman was actively involved with NSUI, the Students Wing of the Indian National Congress. In 1986 he was elected as the General Secretary of NSUI. In the early '90s, Barman emerged as a Youth Leader propagating for the INC. He was appointed the General Secretary of the Tripura Youth Congress in 1991 which he held up to 1994 before getting appointed the Vice President. In 1997 Barman was voted as a member of the Tripura Pradesh Congress Committee & later appointed the vice president of Tripura Pradesh Congress Committee in 2001.

Personal life
Barman is actively involved in the anti-dowry movement, and he is a well-known figure in Tripura for his active participation in blood donation camps. Approximately 200 units of blood have been donated by Tripura Youth Congress. He participated in the National Seminar on the prevention of AIDS held in New Delhi in 2002. Every year he distributes books to down-trodden students.

Political career
Barman contested assembly election for the first time in 1993 from Agartala constituency against former CPI(M) Chief Minister Nripen Chakraborty and lost. Later, in 1998 Barman contested from the same constituency & defeated CPI(M) leader Krishna Rakshit by a margin of 2062 votes. He won 5 assembly elections consecutively since 1998 defeating prominent Communist leaders Dr Bikash Roy, Sankar Prasad Datta, Krishna Rakshit respectively. In 2016, he is one of the six MLAs from Indian National Congress who joined All India Trinamool Congress, due to various inconsistencies with the Indian National Congress allying with Communist Party of India (Marxist) in 2016 West Bengal Legislative Assembly election. On 7 August 2017, he along with 5 other AITC MLAs of Tripura Legislative Assembly joined BJP in presence of Himanta Biswa Sarma and Dharmendra Pradhan after they cross voted against the party lines in 2017 Indian presidential election. In March 2018, Barman was appointed the Health Minister designated with other portfolios at the Biplab Deb Cabinet but was removed shortly as the Cabinet Minister due to his anti party activities. On 7 February 2022, he and MLA Ashish Kumar Saha resigned from their MLA post and quit BJP. On 8 February, Barman, along with his supporters, joined INC.

Controversy

 On 19 December 2016, Barman snatched the silver mace belonging to the Speaker of the Legislative Assembly and ran off with it while INC and AITC MLAs were criticizing the Forest Minister Naresh Jamatia over womanizing.

 On 2012, he and his brother Sandip have beaten an on duty Army Officer in front of the media for the latter wanted reimbursement of Tata Docomo, which the franchise has been taken by the Barman family in Agartala.

References

Living people
People from Agartala
Leaders of the Opposition in Tripura
Tripura politicians
Indian National Congress politicians from Tripura
Trinamool Congress politicians from Tripura
Bharatiya Janata Party politicians from Tripura
Tripura MLAs 2018–2023
State cabinet ministers of Tripura
1966 births
Tripura University alumni
Tripura MLAs 2023–2028